Dasht Konar (also Romanized as Dasht Konār, Dasht-e Kanār, Dasht-e Kenār, Dasht-e Konār, Dasht-i-Kanār, and Dasht Kanār) is a village in Abshur Rural District, Forg District, Darab County, Fars Province, Iran. At the 2006 census, its population was 21, in 8 families.

References 

Populated places in Darab County